D-Ivy College  is a school located in Lagos, Nigeria.

It was established in 1998 to provide an international education.

The school is a co-educational boarding and day school for children aged from 3 to 18 years.

Degrees
The school is recognized for its higher levels of education, i.e., International General Certificate of Secondary Education and A-level.

See also

 Education in Nigeria
 List of schools in Lagos

External links
 , the school's official website

1998 establishments in Nigeria
Boarding schools in Nigeria
Educational institutions established in 1998
International Baccalaureate schools
Primary schools in Nigeria
Schools in Lagos
Secondary schools in Lagos State